Mes Courants Électriques (English: "My Electric Currents") is the second studio album by the French singer Alizée, released on 18 March 2003 through Polydor. Unlike her previous album, which was entirely in French, this album has English versions of four of its songs. As with Alizée's first album, the entire production was the work of Mylène Farmer (Lyrics) and Laurent Boutonnat (Music), but this would be the pair's last work with Alizée.

Unlike Alizée's earlier album, this album was customised for different markets, with slightly different contents. The French version did not contain any English versions of any of the tracks, whereas the international version included four English language renditions. The Japan version refers to "J'en ai marre!" as "Mon bain de mousse". In Taiwan and Hong Kong, and other traditional Chinese spoken parts of Asia, this album was launched as a two-CD set, along with an Enhanced CD not playable on DVD/VCD players, featuring videos of "Moi... Lolita" and "J'en ai marre!"

Background 

Mes Courants Électriques was released on 18 March 2003 two years after  her previous album Gourmandises. Released on the Universal Distribution label this was the last album recorded on this label, and was seen as the album to reinforce Alizée's international career, being a guest star on many TV shows around the world, but it was focussed on the Asian market, as she visited Japan in 2003 and was the spokesperson for many Japanese products. In this album Alizee was showing she is growing. Mes Courants Électriques tones down some of the overt sexual themes of her debut album, but retains the energy. Mes Courants Électriques was digitally mastered using 24-bits technology and follows the libertine philosophy of her mentor, Mylène Farmer.

Promotion

For the promotion of the album, Alizée traveled around the world performing in different places.
After the Gourmandises success, the singer returned to France to promote her second studio album. The first single extracted from the album was "J'en ai marre!", officially released in February 2003. The single was made available in music stores as well as radio stations. To promote the single, Alizée appeared on the French radio station, NRJ, the video for the single was released for broadcast on March,  though it was made available on MTV and many other TV channels. It was released on physical media, both CD and vinyl, on the same month. After the release of the single came in total success playing in all radio stations and in TV shows, ranking in the top charts of many countries.

Another track from the album, "I'm Fed Up!", the English version of the first single, in Asia was released with the name "Mon bain de mousse" was leaked one month before the album was released. Though the song was not mentioned by name, the leak was confirmed in a press release which revealed the title and release schedule of the album. For that moment, Alizée was preparing her trip to Japan where the album was more focused in the Asian market. In Japan, she performed in many TV shows for the promotion of album, gave many interviews to the press of the country, and was the spokeswoman of many Japanese brands. After her return to France, she arranged the release of the second single of album J'ai pas vingt ans and I'm Not Twenty (English version of the single). The music video was released for the single, and for the promotion of the single and the album she performed at the Tour de France 2003 in the official event show in Paris.

Following the success of the album, Alizée continued performing around Europe, kept promoting her album, and released her seventh single and the third and last of the album called À contre-courant. She then announced her first tour called the En Concert Tour. Alizée keep promoting her tour and her last two album, which stayed on top of the charts.

Singles
"J'en ai marre!" is the first single of the album. Released in February 2003, it had the single version of the song followed by an instrumental version. Later on three remixes were made available in special editions of the single. Internationally, it was released as "I'm Fed Up!". In Japan, it was released as "Mon bain de mousse" ("my foam bath") along with a music video and a remix version of the song. "J'ai pas vingt ans" is the second extract of the album, released in June 2003. The single featured, in addition to the solo version of the song, an instrumental version as well as "I'm Fed Up!", which is the English version of "J'en ai marre!". The English version of "J'ai pas vingt ans" is "I'm Not Twenty". "J'ai pas vingt ans" was remixed by Benny Benassi. "À contre-courant" is the third and last single of the album, was released on 7 October 2003. It featured the single version of the song as well as the English version of "J'ai pas vingt ans", "I'm Not Twenty". Maxi CD of the single, released on 12 November 2003, included 3 remixes and the radio edit of the single.

Critical reception

Track listing

Personnel

 Alizée - Vocals & Backing Vocals
 Laurent Boutonnat & Mylène Farmer - Music, Lyrics & Costume
 Jean-Jacques Charles & Jean-Philippe Audin - Orchestra Director
 Ann Calvert - Backing Vocals (C'est trop tard)
 Bernard Paganotti - Bass

 Henry Neu - Design
 Loïc Pontieux & Mathieu Rabaté - Drums
 Paul van Parys - Executive Producer
 Philippe Bouley - Guitar
 Jérôme Devoise & Vincent Chevalot - Mix

Charts

Certifications and sales

Release history

References

External links
Chart Information

2003 albums
Alizée albums
Polydor Records albums